Calvin Elroy Pickering (born September 29, 1976) is a former professional baseball first baseman. He played in Major League Baseball between 1998 and 2005 for the Baltimore Orioles (1998–1999), Cincinnati Reds (2001), Boston Red Sox (2001), and Kansas City Royals (2004–2005). He also played for the SK Wyverns of the KBO League in 2005.

Career
In a five-season Major League career, Pickering posted a .223 batting average with 14 home runs and 45 RBI in 95 games played.

He has also played in Mexico with the Cañeros de Los Mochis (2002–2003) and in Korean baseball with the SK Wyverns (2006).

Following surgery in the 2006–07 offseason, Pickering signed with the Kansas City T-Bones of the independent Northern League and played the 2007 season there. He batted .310 with 18 home runs and 83 RBI in 89 games.

In 2008, Pickering signed with the Bridgeport Bluefish of the independent Atlantic League, but was released on July 13 after batting only .265. He then signed with the Schaumburg Flyers of the Northern League and hit .298 with 14 home runs in only 37 games.

External links

Career statistics and player information from Korea Baseball Organization

1976 births
Living people
Baltimore Orioles players
Boston Red Sox players
Bluefield Orioles players
Bowie Baysox players
Bridgeport Bluefish players
C. Leon King High School alumni
Cincinnati Reds players
Delmarva Shorebirds players
Expatriate baseball players in South Korea
Gulf Coast Orioles players
Kansas City Royals players
Kansas City T-Bones players
KBO League infielders
Louisville RiverBats players
Louisville Bats players
Major League Baseball designated hitters
Major League Baseball first basemen
Major League Baseball players from the United States Virgin Islands
Mexican League baseball first basemen
Omaha Royals players
People from Saint Thomas, U.S. Virgin Islands
Rochester Red Wings players
Schaumburg Flyers players
SSG Landers players
Vaqueros Laguna players
United States Virgin Islands expatriate baseball players in Mexico